was a Japanese feudal lord (daimyō) of the Edo period, the 27th in the line of Shimazu clan lords of Satsuma Domain (r. 1809–1851). He was the father of Shimazu Nariakira, Shimazu Hisamitsu and Ikeda Naritoshi (1811–1842).

1791 births
1859 deaths
Daimyo
Shimazu clan